Sandeshkhali is a village in India. It may also refer to:

Sandeshkhali I, a community development block in Basirhat subdivision of North 24 Parganas district in the Indian state of West Bengal
Sandeshkhali II, a community development block in Basirhat subdivision of North 24 Parganas district in the Indian state of West Bengal
Sandeshkhali (Vidhan Sabha constituency), an assembly constituency in North 24 Parganas district in the Indian state of West Bengal